The Dalrymple-White Baronetcy, of High Mark in the County of Wigtown, is a title in the Baronetage of the United Kingdom. It was created on 28 July 1926 for the soldier and Conservative politician Godfrey Dalrymple-White. As of 2007 the title is held by his grandson, the third Baronet, who succeeded his father in 2006.

Sir Henry Dalrymple White (1820–1886), father of the first Baronet, was a general in the Army and commanded the 6th (Inniskilling) Dragoons during the Crimean War. Sir John Chambers White (died 1845), grandfather of the first Baronet, was a vice-admiral in the Royal Navy. He married Charlotte Elizabeth, daughter of General Sir Hew Whiteford Dalrymple, 1st Baronet (see Dalrymple baronets).

Dalrymple-White baronets, of High Mark (1926)
Sir Godfrey Dalrymple Dalrymple-White, 1st Baronet (1866–1954)
Wing Commander Sir Henry Arthur Dalrymple Dalrymple-White, 2nd Baronet (1917–2006)
Sir Jan Hew Dalrymple-White, 3rd Baronet (born 1950)

See also
Dalrymple baronets
Dalrymple-Hay baronets
Dalrymple-Champneys baronets

Notes

References
Kidd, Charles, Williamson, David (editors). Debrett's Peerage and Baronetage (1990 edition). New York: St Martin's Press, 1990.

Dalrymple-White